Nazare Guerra is a school in the Itatira, Ceará, Brazil.

Itatira